Ķekava (historical ) is a town in central Latvia. It is the centre of Ķekava Municipality. Ķekava is situated 17 kilometres south of Riga's city centre.

After the 2021 Latvian administrative reform, Ķekava gained city rights (town status) on 1 July 2022. Ķekava is on small river Ķekaviņa near river Daugava. Reservoir of Riga hydroelectric power station on Daugava is to north-east from the town.

Ķekava was a small village until 1970s (with population of 333 people in 1967). After, a new chicken meat factory (Ķekavas putnu fabrika) was built and the workers village increased population.

Roads 

Roads from Ķekava: Riga—Warsaw (A7), Riga beltway (A5), Ķekava-Plakanciems (V6), Ķekava bypass road (not ended yet).

Sightseeing
 Local History Museum of Ķekava
 Ķekava (Dole) Lutheran Church 
 Lutheran church in Odukalns
 World War I cemetery at Truseļi

Gallery

References

Other websites 

Kzekava
Ķekava Municipality